Kosovo Serbs are one of the ethnic groups of Kosovo. There are around 100,000 Kosovo Serbs as of 2014 and about half of them live in North Kosovo. Other Kosovo Serb communities live in the Southern provinces of Kosovo. After Albanians, they form the largest ethnic community in Kosovo (6–7%).

The medieval Kingdom of Serbia (1217–1346) and the Serbian Empire (1346–1371) included parts of the territory of Kosovo until its annexation by the Ottomans following the Battle of Kosovo (1389), considered one of the most notable events of Serbian history. Afterwards, it was a part of the Serbian Despotate. Modern Serbian historiography considers Kosovo in this period to be the political, religious and cultural core of the medieval Serbian state.

In the Ottoman period (1455-1913), the situation of the Serbian population in Kosovo went through different phases. In the 16th century, the Serbian Patriarchate of Peć was re-established and its status strengthened. At the end of 18th century, the support of the Patriarchate to the Habsburgs during the Great Turkish War of 1683–1699 triggered a wave of migrations to areas under the control of the Habsburg monarchy. After the independence of the Principality of Serbia to its north, Kosovo came increasingly to be seen by the mid-19th century as the "cradle of Serb civilization" and called the "Serbian Jerusalem". Kosovo was annexed by the Kingdom of Serbia in 1912, following the First Balkan War.

As a region of the Kingdom of Yugoslavia, Kosovo was divided in several banovinas. In the pre-World War II period, the Yugoslav colonisation of Kosovo took place which aimed to increase the number of Serbs in Kosovo with colonists from Central Serbia and Montenegro. After World War II, Kosovo's districts were reunited as the Socialist Autonomous Province of Kosovo. Serbs were one of the constituent people of the province within the Socialist Republic of Serbia (1944–1992). As a result of the Kosovo War and following by its declaration of independence, in 2008 it is partially recognised by the international community. Serbs are the second largest community in  Kosovo.

More than half of Kosovo's pre-1999 Serb population (226,000), including 37,000 Romani, 15,000 Balkan Muslims (including Ashkali, Bosniaks, and Gorani), and 7,000 other non-Albanian civilians were expelled to central Serbia and Montenegro, following the Kosovo War. According to the 2013 Brussels Agreement the establishment of a Community of Serb Municipalities, a self-governing association of municipalities with a majority Serb population in Kosovo is proposed.

Terminology
The formal names for the Serb community in Kosovo is "Serbs of Kosovo and Metohija" (Srbi na Kosovu i Metohiji) or "Serbs of Kosmet" (Kosmetski Srbi), in use by the community itself and the Serbian government. They are also referred to as Serbs of Kosovo or Serbs in Kosovo. The term "Kosovo Serbs" is predominantly used in English. They are known by the demonym Kosovari, though this is properly used for inhabitants of the region of Kosovo (in the narrow sense – centred around the Kosovo Field), along with Metohijci (of Metohija).

History

Medieval period

Sclaveni raided and settled the western Balkans in the 6th and 7th century. The White Serbs are mentioned in De Administrando Imperio as having settled the Balkans during the reign of Byzantine Emperor Heraclius (r. 610–641), however, research does not support that the White Serbian tribe was part of this later migration (as held by historiography) rather than migrating with the rest of Early Slavs. Serbian linguistical studies concluded that the Early South Slavs were made up of a western and eastern branch, of parallel streams, roughly divided in the Timok–Osogovo–Šar line.  However, per Ivo Banac in the early Middle Ages Eastern Herzegovinian dialects were Eastern South Slavic, but since the 12th century, the Shtokavian dialects, including Eastern Herzegovinian, began to separate themselves from the rest of the Eastern South Slavic dialects. The Bulgarian Khan Presian (836–852) took over the territory of Kosovo from the Byzantines in the mid-9th century and Kosovo remained under the influence of the first Bulgarian Empire until the Byzantine restoration of the early 11th century. In 1040–41 a massive Bulgarian rebellion broke out, which included Kosovo. Another rebellion broke out in 1072, in which Serbian prince Constantine Bodin was crowned Emperor of Bulgaria at Prizren, however, despite some initial success, Bodin was eventually captured in southern Kosovo and the rebellion was suppressed. Vukan I, the new independent Serbian Grand Prince, began raiding Byzantine territories, first in Kosovo, advancing into Macedonia (1091–95). He broke several peace treaties which he personally negotiated with the Byzantine Emperor at Zvečan and Lipljan, until finally submitting in 1106. 

In 1166, a Serbian prince, Stefan Nemanja, the founder of the Nemanjić dynasty, asserted independence after an uprising against the Byzantine Emperor Manuel I Comnenus. Nemanja defeated his brother, Tihomir, at Pantino near Pauni, and drowned him in the Sitnica river. Nemanja was eventually defeated and had to return some of his conquests, and vouched to the Emperor that he would not raise his hand against him. In 1183, Stefan Nemanja embarked on a new offensive allied with the Kingdom of Hungary after the death of Manuel I Komnenos in 1180, which marked the end of Byzantine domination over the region of Kosovo. Nemanja's son, Stefan, ruled a realm reaching the river of Lab in the south. Stefan conquered all of Kosovo by 1208, by which time he had conquered Prizren and Lipljan, and moved the border of his realm to the Šar mountain. In 1217, Stefan was crowned King of Serbs, due to which he is known in historiography as Stefan "the First-Crowned".

In 1219, the Serbian Church was given autocephaly, with Hvosno, Prizren and Lipljan being the Orthodox Christian eparchies with territory in modern-day Kosovo. By the end of the 13th century, the centre of the Serbian Church was moved to Peć from Žiča.

Prizren serving as the capital of Serbia during the 14th century, and was a centre of trade. King Stefan Dušan founded the great Monastery of the Holy Archangel near Prizren in 1342–1352. During those periods, several major monasteries were endowed with vast possessions in the regions of Kosovo and Metohija. The Serbian Kingdom was elevated into an Empire in 1345–46. Stefan Dušan received John VI Kantakuzenos in 1342 at Pauni to discuss an alliance against the Byzantine Emperor. In 1346, the Serbian Archbishopric at Peć was upgraded into a Patriarchate, but it was not recognized before 1375. After the death of Dušan in 1355, the fall of the Serbian Empire began, with feudal disintegration during the reign of his successor, Stefan Uroš V (r. 1355–1371).

Parts of Kosovo became domains of Vukašin Mrnjavčević, but Vojislav Vojinović expanded his demesne further onto Kosovo. The armies of Vukašin from Pristina and his allies defeated Vojislav's forces in 1369, putting a halt to his advances. After the Battle of Maritsa on 26 September 1371 in which the Mrnjavčević brothers lost their lives, Đurađ I Balšić of Zeta took Prizren and Peć in 1372. A part of Kosovo became the demesne of the Lazar of Serbia.

The Ottoman Empire invaded the realm of Prince Lazar on 28 June 1389, at the Battle of Kosovo near Pristina, at Gazimestan. The Serbian army was led by Prince Lazar who led 12,000–30,000 men against the Ottoman army of 27,000–40,000 men. Lazar was killed in battle, while Sultan Murad also lost his life, believed to have been assassinated by Serbian knight Miloš Obilić. The outcome of the battle is deemed inconclusive, with the new Sultan Bayezid having to retreat to consolidate his power. Vuk Branković came to prominence as the local lord of Kosovo, though he was an Ottoman vassal at times, between 1392 and 1395.

Another battle occurred in Kosovo 1448 between the Hungarian troops supported by the Albanian ruler Gjergj Kastrioti Skanderbeg on one side, and Ottoman troops supported by the Branković dynasty in 1448. Skanderbeg's troops en route to help John Hunyadi were stopped by the Branković's troops, who was more or less an Ottoman vassal. Hungarian regent John Hunyadi lost the battle after a 2-day fight, but essentially stopped the Ottoman advance northwards. In 1455, southern regions of the Serbian Despotate were invaded again, and the region of Kosovo was finally conquered by the Ottoman Empire and incorporated it into the Ottoman administrative system.

In 1455, new castles rose to prominence in Pristina and Vučitrn, centres of Branković District.

Early Modern period
The Ottomans brought Islamization with them, particularly in towns, and later also created the Kosovo Vilayet as one of the Ottoman territorial entities. During the Islamisation many Churches and Holy Orthodox Christian places were razed to the ground or turned into mosques. The big Monastery of Saint Archangels near Prizren was torn down at the end of the 16th century and the material used to build the Mosque of Sinan-pasha, an Islamized Albanian, in Prizren. Although the Serbian Orthodox Church was officially abolished in 1532, an Islamized Serb from Bosnia, Grand Vizier Mehmed-pasha Sokolović influenced the restoration of the Serbian Patriarchate of Peć in 1557. Special privileges were provided, which helped the survival of Serbs and other Christians on Kosovo.

Kosovo was taken by the Austrian forces during the War of the Holy League (1683–1698). In 1690, the Serbian Patriarch of Peć Arsenije III, who previously escaped a certain death, led 37,000 families from Kosovo, to evade Ottoman wrath since Kosovo had just been retaken by the Ottomans. The people that followed him were mostly Serbs, but there were numerous Orthodox Albanians and others too. 20,000 Serbs abandoned Prizren alone. Due to the oppression from the Ottomans, other migrations of Orthodox people from the Kosovo area continued throughout the 18th century. By contrast, some Serbs adopted Islam and gradually fused with the predominant Albanians, and adopting their culture and even language. By the end of the 19th century, Albanians replaced the Serbs as the dominating nation of Kosovo.

In 1766 the Ottomans abolished the Serbian Patriarchate of Peć and the position of Christians on Kosovo was greatly reduced. All previous privileges were lost and the Christian population had to suffer the full weight of the Empire's extensive and losing wars, even to take the blame for the losses.

During the First Serbian Uprising, Serbs from northern parts of Kosovo prepared to join the uprising and an Ottoman-Albanian coalition arrived to suppress their efforts, before they could partake in the uprising. Ottoman violence resulted in a number of Serbs migrating to central Serbia in order to join rebels led by Karađorđe. Kelmendi were the only Albanian tribe to fully support Serb rebels.
 After the independence of the Principality of Serbia to its north, Kosovo came increasingly to be seen by the mid-19th century as the “cradle of Serb civilization” and called the "Serbian Jerusalem".

The term Arnauti or Arnautaši was coined by 19th and early 20th century Serbian ethnographers to refer to the Albanians in Kosovo, which they perceived as Albanised Serbs; Serbs who had converted to Islam and went through a process of Albanisation. In modern anthropology, the historical validity of the term has been criticized as well as use as a tool of nation-building and homogenization policies of the Serbian state.

Atrocities against Serbs during the Serbian–Ottoman War took place at the beginning of the century, with the Kosovo Albanians accused of driving some 150,000 Serbs out of Kosovo and conducting a campaign of terror against the Serbian population who remained. In 1901, massacres of Serbs were carried out by Albanians in North Kosovo and Pristina.

Modern period

The arising Kingdom of Serbia planned a restoration of its rule in Kosovo as Ottoman might crumbled on the Balkan peninsula. The period witnessed a rise of Serbian nationalism. During the First Balkan War, the Kingdom of Serbia and the Kingdom of Montenegro fought alongside the Kingdoms of Greece and Bulgaria as part of the Balkan League to drive the Ottoman forces out of Europe and to incorporate the spoils into their respective states. Serbia, Montenegro and Greece had occupied the entire Western Balkan (Albanian-inhabited territories) with the exception of Vlora in the hope of achieving recognition with their new borders. Resistance from the Albanians across their entire region in favour of their own proposed independent nation state led to fighting between the Balkan League armies (less geographically uninvolved Bulgaria) and Albanian forces. To end the conflict, the Treaty of London decreed an independent Principality of Albania (close to its present borders), with most of the Vilayet of Kosovo awarded to Serbia and the Metohija region awarded to Montenegro.

World War I and First Yugoslavia
During the First World War, in the winter of 1915–1916, the Serbian army withdrew through Kosovo in a bid to evade the forces of the Central Powers. Thousands died of starvation and exposure. In 1918, the Serbian army pushed the Central Powers out of Kosovo, and the region was unified as Montenegro subsequently joined the Kingdom of Serbia. The monarchy was then transformed into the Kingdom of Serbs, Croats and Slovenes.

The 1918–1929 period of the Kingdom of Serbs, Croats and Slovenes witnessed a decrease in the Serbian population of the region and an increase in the number of Albanians. In 1929, the state was renamed the Kingdom of Yugoslavia. The territories of Kosovo were split among the Zeta Banovina, the Banate of Morava and the Banate of Vardar. The state lasted until the World War II invasion and Axis occupation of Yugoslavia (1941).

World War II

After the invasion of Yugoslavia (6–18 April 1941), the Axis powers divided territory among themselves. Kosovo and Metohija was divided between Italian, German and Bulgarian occupation. The largest part of what is today Kosovo was under Italian occupation and was annexed into a axis Greater Albania, the Albanian Kingdom through a decree on 12 August 1941, while northern parts were included in German-occupied Serbia, and southeastern parts into the Bulgarian occupational zone. Parts of eastern Montenegro and western Macedonia were also annexed to Albania.

During the occupation, the population was subject to expulsion, internment, forced labour, torture, destruction of private property, confiscation of land and livestock, destruction and damaging of monasteries, churches, cultural-historical monuments and graveyards. There were waves of violence against Serbs in some periods, such as April 1941, June 1942, September 1943, and continuous pressure in various ways. Civilians were sent to camps and prisons established by the Italian, German and Bulgarian occupation, and the Albanian community. The expulsion of Serbs proved problematic, as they had performed important functions in the region, and been running most of the businesses, mills, tanneries, and public utilities, and been responsible for most of the useful agricultural production. Most of the war crimes were perpetrated by the Vulnetari ("volunteers"), Balli Kombëtar and the SS Skanderbeg Division. The Skanderbeg Division was better known for murdering, raping, and looting in predominantly Serbian areas than for participating in combat operations on behalf of the German war effort. The most harsh position of Serbs was in the Italian (Albanian) zone. A large part of the Serb population was expelled or forced to flee in order to survive. Serbian estimations put the number of expelled at around 100,000; an estimated 40,000 from the Italian-occupation zone, 30,000 from the German zone, and 25,000 from the Bulgarian zone. It is estimated that 10,000 Serbs and Montenegrins were killed in Kosovo during WWII.

Second Yugoslavia
The Province of Kosovo was formed in 1946 as an autonomous region to protect its regional Albanian majority within the People's Republic of Serbia as a member of the Federal People's Republic of Yugoslavia under the leadership of the former Partisan leader, Josip Broz Tito, but with no factual autonomy. After Yugoslavia's name changed to the Socialist Federal Republic of Yugoslavia and Serbia's to the Socialist Republic of Serbia in 1953, the Autonomous Region of Kosovo gained some autonomy in the 1960s. In the 1974 constitution, the Socialist Autonomous Province of Kosovo's government received higher powers, including the highest governmental titles – President and Premier and a seat in the Federal Presidency which made it a de facto Socialist Republic within the Federation, but remaining as a Socialist Autonomous Region within the Socialist Republic of Serbia. 

In 1981, Albanian students organized protests seeking that Kosovo become a Republic within Yugoslavia. Those protests were in
Serbian and Albanian were defined official on the Provincial level marking the two largest linguistic Kosovan groups: Serbs and Albanians. In the 1970s, an Albanian nationalist movement pursued full recognition of the Province of Kosovo as another republic within the federation, while the most extreme elements aimed for full-scale independence. Tito's government dealt with the situation swiftly, but only gave it a temporary solution. The ethnic balance of Kosovo witnessed unproportional increase as the number of Albanians rose dramatically due to higher birth rates. Serbs barely increased and dropped in the full share of the total population down to 10% due to higher demographic raise of the Albanian population.

In 1981, Albanian students organized protests seeking that Kosovo become a Republic within Yugoslavia. Those protests were harshly contained by the centralist Yugoslav government. In 1986, the Serbian Academy of Sciences and Arts (SANU) was working on a document, which later would be known as the SANU Memorandum. An unfinished edition was filtered to the press. In the essay, SANU explained the Serbian peoples history as victims of a 500-year and more genocide from Kosovo, and therefore called for the revival of Serb nationalism. During this time, Slobodan Milošević's rise to power started in the League of the Socialists of Serbia. Milošević used the discontent reflected in the SANU memorandum for his political goals.

One of the events that contributed to Milošević's rise of power was the Gazimestan Speech, delivered in front of 1,000,000 Serbs at the central celebration marking the 600th anniversary of the Battle of Kosovo, held at Gazimestan on 28 June 1989.

Soon afterwards, as approved by the Assembly in 1990, the autonomy of Kosovo was revoked back to the old status (1971). He had said "Strong Serbia, Weak Yugoslavia – Weak Serbia, Strong Yugoslavia" Milošević, however, did not remove Kosovo's seat from the Federal Presidency. After Slovenia's secession from Yugoslavia in 1991, Milošević used the seat to attain dominance over the Federal government, outvoting his opponents.

Breakup of Yugoslavia and Kosovo War
After the Dayton Agreement of 1995, the Kosovo Liberation Army, ethnic-Albanian paramilitary organisation that sought the separation of Kosovo and the eventual creation of a Greater Albania, began attacking Serbian civilians and Yugoslav army and police, bombing police stations and government buildings, killing Yugoslav police and innocent people of all nationalities, even Albanians who were not on their side. , mass graves of Kosovar Albanian victims are still being found. There have been many reports of abuses and war crimes committed by the KLA during and after the conflict, such as massacres of civilians (Lake Radonjić massacre, Gnjilane, Staro Gracko, Klečka etc.), prison camps (Lapušnik), organ theft and destruction of medieval churches and monuments.

According to the 1991 Yugoslavia census, there were 194,190 Serbs in Kosovo after the Kosovo War, a large number of Serbs fled or were expelled and many of the remaining civilians were subjected to abuse. During the unrest in Kosovo, 35 churches and monasteries were destroyed or seriously damaged. After Kosovo and other Yugoslav Wars, Serbia became home to highest number of refugees and IDPs (including Kosovo Serbs) in Europe.

In total, 156 Serbian Orthodox churches and monasteries have been destroyed since June 1999, after the end of the Kosovo War and including the 2004 pogrom. Many of the churches and monasteries dated back to the 12th, 13th and 14th centuries. KLA fighters are accused of vandalizing Devič monastery and terrorizing the staff. The KFOR troops said KLA rebels vandalized centuries-old murals and paintings in the chapel and stole two cars and all the monastery's food.

21st century
The interim Kosovo government unilaterally declared independence from Serbia on Sunday, 17 February 2008.  Serbia refuses to recognise this declaration of independence. Kosovo's self-proclaimed independence has been recognised by 98 UN countries, and one non-UN country, the Republic of China (Taiwan). The remaining Kosovo Serbs (mostly in North Kosovo) want to remain part of Serbia, but Serbian majority towns are now rare in Kosovo.

Some officials in the Serbian government have proposed a partition of Kosovo, with North Kosovo and Štrpce becoming part of Serbia or given autonomy. The United States opposes the partition of Kosovo, stressing that the "great majority of countries around the world are not going to stand for that." In response to the seizure of railways in Northern Kosovo and formation of Serbian offices to serve as part of a parallel government, Kosovo's Prime Minister stated that they would "not tolerate any parallel institution on Kosovo's territory" and would assert their authority over all of Kosovo. The UN's Special Representative in Kosovo said the "international community has made it very clear that no partition of Kosovo will be acceptable." Ivan Eland, a Senior Fellow at the Independent Institute, suggested such "a partition within a partition" would prevent a "Serbia-Kosovo War" and provides the "best chance" of Kosovo having a long-term stable relationship with Serbia. Chairman of the Serb Municipalities of Kosovo Alliance Marko Jakšić dismissed the talk of partition and said the action of Serbs in Kosovo is to protest the Kosovo declaration. Oliver Ivanović, a Kosovo Serb political leader, said he was against Kosovo's partition because "most Serbs live south of the Ibar and their position would become unsustainable". A Reuters analysis suggested that Kosovo may be divided along ethnic lines similar to Bosnia-Herzegovina. James Lyon of the International Crisis Group thinktank was quoted as saying, "the Republika Srpska style is acceptable for Serbia, but within the confines that it (Kosovo) is still part of Serbia." Pieter Feith, the European Union's special representative in Kosovo, and the International Civilian Representative for Kosovo said no plans are under discussion to carve out a canton or grant any other autonomy to Serbs living in the north of Kosovo. He told the Pristina, Kosovo, daily Koha Ditore, "It is quite clear that the privileged relations between the Serbs here (in Kosovo) and Belgrade are in the spheres of education, health care, and religious objects," adding that "the government in Pristina has to be respected."

On 30 September 2008, Serbian President Boris Tadić stated that he would consider partitioning Kosovo if all other options were exhausted. The former Foreign Minister for Serbia and Montenegro, Goran Svilanović, applauded the suggestion saying "finally this is a realistic approach coming from Serbia. Finally, after several years, there is a room to discuss." After his comments aroused controversy in the media, Tadić reiterated that he was suggesting this as a possibility only if all other options were exhausted.

In the Brussels Agreement of 2013, Serbia agreed to grant the government in Pristina authority over Kosovo, while Pristina made an agreement to form Community of Serb Municipalities, which has not been fulfilled. Kosovo Serbs have accepted many aspects of Kosovo's rule and Kosovo Serbs now vote on Kosovo central election commission ballots in local elections.

During the COVID-19 pandemic, Kosovo Serbs found themselves in a limbo, stuck between different orders issued by Serbia and Kosovo. In November 2020, during the COVID pandemics, Kosovo policemen and inspectors stormed and temporarily closed several Serb-owned pharmacies in North Kosovo, attempting to confiscate medicine supplies, because the items were allegedly not registered within the central system in Pristina. The act was met with citizen protest which were on the verge of escalation.  In December 2020, the vaccines for COVID-19 were sent to North Kosovo by Serbia without any consultation with Kosovan authorities. Kosovo opposed the arrival of those vaccines, claiming that they were illegally distributed by Serbia. Only few people were vaccinated and the remaining vaccines were sent back after an investigation was launched. In 2021 health workers from North Kosovo protested against arrests of their colleagues who are employed in the hospitals which take care of patients with COVID-19. They described the actions as "inhumane" and sent protesting letters to various international institutions and organisations.

Kosovo’s Serb minority is often the target of demonstrations of hostility and attacks. In addition to that, members of the Kosovo Serbs community face mistreatment and prejudice in Serbia too.

Demographics

During the 20th century, the Serb population of Kosovo constantly decreased. Today, Serbs mostly populate the enclaves across Kosovo, as well as North Kosovo, which  comprises 11% of Kosovo's territory  and where they comprise 95% of population. . Diplomats from the United Nations have voiced concern over slow progress on minority rights. Human Rights Watch pointed out discrimination against Serbs and Roma in Kosovo immediately after the war.

ECMI calculated, based on 2010 and 2013 estimations, that ca. 146,128 Serbs resided in Kosovo, that is, ca. 7.8% of the total population. In 2012, the Helsinki Committee for Human Rights in Serbia estimated that the number was 90–120,000. The Republic of Kosovo-organized 2011 census did not take place in North Kosovo, and was boycotted by a considerable number of Serbs in southern Kosovo. The ECMI did call "for caution when referring to the 2011 Census in Kosovo". There are ten municipalities constituted by a Serb numerical majority. These are the four northern municipalities of North Mitrovica, Leposavić, Zvečan, Zubin Potok, and the six southern (enclave) municipalities of Gračanica, Štrpce, Novo Brdo, Ranilug, Parteš and Klokot. As of 2014, the OSCE estimates that around 96,000 Serbs live in Kosovo.

The UNHCR estimated in 2019 that the total number of IDPs (Serbs and non-Serbs) from Kosovo in Serbia are 68,514. Serbia has claimed (2018) that a total 199,584 IDPs from Kosovo (Serbs and non-Serbs) origin have settled and live in Serbia after the war based on the original data it gathered in 2000. The UNHCR reported in 2009, based on the official figures by the government of Serbia, that around 205,835 IDPs who fled from Kosovo lived in Serbia. These included Serbs, Roma, Ashkali and Egyptians. The registration data in 2000 are the only official data which have been generated and there has been no re-registration of IDPs in Serbia since 2000. The same figure has been used in all official reports since then with some statistical reconfigurations. As such, the reliability of the registration of IDPs living in Serbia has been questioned.

In 2003, the number of Kosovo Serb IDPs in Montenegro was  12,000. The numbers do not include those that have received Montenegrin citizenship. As of 2015, there were at least 6,600 Kosovo Serb refugees in Montenegro. By 2019, there were 135 IDPs in total in Montenegro from Kosovo.

Culture

The Battle of Kosovo is particularly important to Serbian history, tradition, and national identity.

Eparchy of Raška and Prizren of Serbian orthodox church take care of Serbian people and Orthodox heritage in Kosovo. Numerous Serbian Orthodox monasteries and churches are spread around Kosovo. Some of them include: Banjska monastery, Devič monastery, Gračanica monastery, Patriarchal Monastery of Peć, Visoki Dečani monastery and Our Lady of Ljeviš. The last four make up the Medieval Monuments in Kosovo, founded by the Nemanjić dynasty, is a combined World Heritage Site.

Medieval fortifications built by Serbian rulers and lords present important cultural heritage.

In connection with social gatherings among the Serbs around the churches and monasteries called Sabori during the Slava and Hram (Patron of the monastery) there was a belief that everyone must dance (to instrumental accompaniments) in order to gain and secure good health. In upper Prizren the Sabor was held on 21 November by the ruins of the monastery of the Holy archangel founded by the Serbian Emperor Stefan Dušan the Mighty in the 14th century. There were also great social gatherings at the Kaljaja fortress.

Serbian folk music is rich in a large number of songs from Kosovo, which were especially preserved in the performances of Jordan Nikolić and Mara Đorđević.

The Serbs in Kosovo speak the dialects of Zeta-South Raška, Kosovo-Resava, and Prizren-South Morava.

UNESCO World Heritage Sites

Prominent people

Monarchs

Lazar of Serbia, Serbian ruler who led the army in the Battle of Kosovo
Dragana of Serbia, Bulgarian empress consort
Musić noble family
Jelena Balšić, Serbian noblewoman
Jovan Dragoslav, Serbian nobleman
Mladen, magnate and vojvoda
Vuk Branković, lord of District of Branković
Đurađ Branković, lord of District of Branković
Mara Branković 
Kantakuzina Katarina Branković 
Mahmud Pasha Angelović, Grand Vizier of the Ottoman Empire

Politicians
Radivoje Milojković, prime minister of Principality of Serbia
Dušan Mugoša, Presidents of the Assembly of SAP Kosovo
Ilija Vakić, Chairman of the Executive Council of SAP Kosovo
Bogoljub Nedeljković, Chairman of the Executive Council of SAP Kosovo
Dragan Tomić, acting President of Serbia
Aleksandar Tijanić, Minister of Information of Serbia and director of the Radio Television of Serbia
Ivica Dačić, Prime Minister of Serbia
Jorgovanka Tabaković, Governor of the National Bank of Serbia
Goran Svilanović, Minister of Foreign Affairs of Serbia and Montenegro
Slobodan Petrović, Deputy Prime Minister of Republic of Kosovo
Aleksandar Jablanović, Minister of Communities and Returns of Republic of Kosovo
Branislav Grbić, Minister of Communities and Returns of Republic of Kosovo
Dalibor Jevtić, Minister of Communities and Returns of Republic of Kosovo
Oliver Ivanović, State Secretary of the Ministry for Kosovo and Metohija
Bogoljub Karić, businessman and politician
Vladimir Dobričanin, doctor and politician, Member of the Parliament of Montenegro
Borislav Pelević
Dragan Velić
Radovan Ničić
Slaviša Ristić

Religious people

Joanikije II, Archbishop of Peć and first Serbian Patriarch
Pajsije, Archbishop of Peć and Serbian Patriarch
Vikentije Popović-Hadžilavić, the first metropolitan of Metropolitanate of Karlovci
Arsenije IV Jovanović Šakabenta, Archbishop of Peć and Serbian Patriarch
Lazar the Serb, monk and horologist who invented and built the first known mechanical public clock in Russia
Martin Segon, Catholic Bishop of Ulcinj

Military people

Miloš Obilić, knight during the invasion of the Ottoman Empire
Vuk Isaković, military commander in Austrian service during the Austrian-Ottoman Wars
Čolak-Anta, military commander and one of the most important figures of the First Serbian Uprising
Vukajlo Božović, Serbian Orthodox priest and revolutionary who participated in the Balkan Wars as a commander of a detachment in Ibarski Kolašin
Jake Allex, Serbian American soldier who received the Medal of Honor for his service in the U.S. Army during World War I
Boro Vukmirović, one of the organizers of the anti-fascist uprising in Kosovo
Živko Gvozdić, commander in the Balkan Wars and World War I
Kosta Pećanac, Chetnik commander
Lazar Kujundžić, Chetnik commander
Sava Petrović-Grmija, Chetnik soldier
Božidar Delić, general of the Army of Yugoslavia
Veljko Radenović, Serbian police general
Zoran Radosavljević, pilot
Milan Mojsilović, Chief of General Staff of the Serbian Armed Forces

Writers
Elder Grigorije, Serbian Orthodox clergyman and writer
Marko Pećki, writer and poet
Konstantin Mihailović, author of a memoir of his time as a Jannissary in the army of the Ottoman Empire.
Dimitrije Kantakuzin, writer who lived in the 15th century 
Vladislav the Grammarian, an Orthodox Christian monk, scribe, historian and theologian
Grigorije Božović, writer
Lazar Vučković, poet
David Albahari, Serbian Jewish writer
Darinka Jevrić, poet
Dejan Stojanović, poet, writer and essayist
Novica Petković, writer, professor and member of ANURS
Mošo Odalović, poet

Science and education
Gligorije Elezović, historian and member of the Serbian Academy of Science and Arts
Atanasije Urošević, geographer and ethnologist
Radivoje Papović, Rector of the University of Pristina
Nebojša Radunović, professor of Obstetrics and Gynecology at University of Belgrade's School of Medicine and a corresponding member of the Serbian Academy of Sciences and Arts
Marko Savić, pianist and professor at the University of Pristina Faculty of Arts
Anđelko Karaferić, musician, Professor of Counterpoint and Associate Dean at the University of Pristina Faculty of Arts
Andrijana Videnović, actress and Associate Professor of Diction at the University of Pristina Faculty of Arts
Jasmina Novokmet, conductor, professor and former Associate Dean at the University of Pristina
Aleksandra Trajković, pianist, Assistant Professor of Piano and Chief of the Piano Department at the University of Pristina
Tomislav Trifić, graphic artist and Dean of the University of Pristina Faculty of Arts
Branibor Debeljković, artist, historian and professor
Slađana Đurić, professor of philosophy and sociology

Art

Visual art
Svetomir Arsić-Basara, sculptor
Branibor Debeljković, photographer
Aleksandar Joksimović, fashion designer
Trajko Stojanović Kosovac, graphic artist, painter, scenographer
Slobodan Trajković, painter

Cinema and theatre

Ljuba Tadić, Dobričin prsten and four-time Golden Arena for Best Actor winner
Mira Stupica, Dobričin prsten and Golden Arena for Best Actress winner
Dragoslav Ilić
Dragan Maksimović
Miodrag Krivokapić
Saša Pantić
Milan Vasić
Predrag Vasić

Music

 
Jordan Nikolić, folk singer who interpreted traditional songs from Kosovo
Brankica Vasić Vasilisa, performer of traditional songs from Kosovo and Macedonia
Milica Milisavljević Dugalić, performer of traditional songs from Kosovo 
Bora Spužić Kvaka, folk singer
Dragica Radosavljević Cakana, folk singer
Viktorija, rock artist who represented Yugoslavia in the Eurovision Song Contest 1982 as part of Aska
Đani, folk singer
Jana, folk singer
Tina Ivanović, folk singer
Slađa Delibašić, pop singer and dancer
Peđa Medenica, pop-folk singer
Stefan Đurić Rasta, popular musician
Nevena Božović, pop singer who represented Serbia in the Junior Eurovision Song Contest 2007, with band Moje 3 in the Eurovision Song Contest 2013 and solo in the Eurovision Song Contest 2019

Sport

Milutin Šoškić, football player and Olympic champion
Vladimir Durković, football player and Olympic champion
Stevan Stojanović, football goalkeeper and European Cup champion
Goran Đorović, football player
Ranko Popović, football player and coach
Mladen Dodić, football player and coach
Dragoljub Bekvalac, football player and coach
Darko Spalević, football player
Nenad Stojković, football player
Nikola Lazetić, football player
Miloš Krasić, football player and 2009 Serbian Footballer of the Year
Milan Biševac, football player
Miodrag Anđelković, football player
Aleksandar Čanović, football player
Miroslav Vulićević, football player
Miloš Ostojić, football player
Milan Milanović, football player
Aleksandar Paločević, football player
Đorđe Jovanović, football player
Sreten Mirković, boxer and European Amateur Championships silver medalist
Marko Simonović, basketball player, Olympic and World Cup silver medalist
Miloš Bojović, basketball player
Miljana Bojović, basketball player
Bojan Krstović, basketball player
Dejan Musli, basketball player
Milena Rašić, volleyball player, World and European champion, Olympic silver medalist
Vaso Komnenić, high jumper
Darko Radomirović, middle distance and long-distance runner
Sonja Stolić, middle distance and long-distance runner
Novak Djokovic, tennis player, World No.1 and 17-time Grand Slam champion
Danijela Rundqvist,  Swedish ice hockey player and two-time Olympic medalist
Luka Dončić, Slovenian basketball player, European and EuroLeague champion

Other
Sima Igumanov, merchant who made a fortune through tobacco trade and invested his fortune in building educational facilities
Bogdan Radenković, an organizer of the Serbian Chetnik Organization and one of the founders of the Black Hand
Đorđe Martinović, farmer from who was at the centre of a notorious incident in May 1985
Zvezdan Jovanović, former paramilitary, JSO Commander and convicted criminal
Anđelka Tomašević, Miss Earth Serbia 2013 and Miss Universe Serbia 2014
Katarina Šulkić, Miss Serbia 2015

See also
Community of Serb Municipalities
Serbian enclaves in Kosovo
Enclave (film), a 2015 Serbian film
Gorani people
Janjevci

Notes

Annotations

References

Sources

Further reading

Books
 
 
 
 
 
  
 
 
 
 
 
 
 
 
 
 
 
  
 
 
 
 
 
 
 

Journals
 
 

Conference papers

External links
Filling the Vacuum: Ensuring Protection and Legal Remedies for Minorities in Kosovo by Minority Rights Group International (May 2009)
Groups working with all demographics in Kosovo

 
Ethnic groups in Kosovo
Kosovo
History of Kosovo